Carlos Alberto Bastos Parente (born 8 April 1961 in Luanda, Portuguese Angola) is a Portuguese retired footballer who played as a central midfielder.

Club career
After a one-year youth spell at S.L. Benfica, Parente signed for neighbouring G.D. Estoril-Praia, and the 18-year-old did not miss one single match in the 1979–80 campaign, with the club being nonetheless relegated from the Primeira Liga. He then moved to Académica de Coimbra, meeting the same fate in his first season and playing a further three years with the Students in the second division.

Parente joined Boavista F.C. in the summer of 1984, going on to remain in the top level for one entire decade, also having represented Porto neighbours S.C. Salgueiros. Whilst with the former, in 1987–88, he scored a career-best nine goals in 33 games to help the team finish in fifth position, narrowly missing on qualification to the UEFA Cup; he retired from professional football at the age of 33, amassing top flight totals of 229 matches and 24 goals.

International career
Following the defection of practically all of the international players after the infamous Saltillo Affair at the 1986 FIFA World Cup, Parente earned two caps for the Portugal national team, both coming in the next year. His first arrived on 11 November, as he played the second half of a 0–0 home draw to Switzerland for the UEFA Euro 1988 qualifiers.

In 1979, Parente appeared with the under-20s at the FIFA World Cup in Japan, his output for the eventual quarter-finalists consisting of 50 minutes against Canada in the group stage (1–3 loss).

External links

1961 births
Living people
Angolan people of Portuguese descent
Footballers from Luanda
Portuguese footballers
Association football midfielders
Primeira Liga players
Liga Portugal 2 players
Segunda Divisão players
S.U. Sintrense players
G.D. Estoril Praia players
Associação Académica de Coimbra – O.A.F. players
Boavista F.C. players
S.C. Salgueiros players
F.C. Marco players
Portugal youth international footballers
Portugal under-21 international footballers
Portugal international footballers